Madonna and Child with Saint Peter and Saint Sebastian is an 84 cm by 61 cm oil painting by Giovanni Bellini, dating to 1487 and bought in 1859 by the Louvre in Paris, where it still hangs today.

References

1487 paintings
Paintings in the Louvre by Italian artists
Paintings of the Madonna and Child by Giovanni Bellini